Gelora 10 November Stadium (literally "10 November Sports Arena Stadium"), formerly known as Tambaksari Stadium, is a football stadium located in Tambaksari, Surabaya, East Java, Indonesia. It is currently used mostly for association football matches. Originally a football field named Tambaksari Field, the stadium holds 20,000 people. The stadium is widely known to has Pterocarpus indicus trees inside. The current name derives from the one day during Battle of Surabaya, widely known as Indonesian Heroes' Day.

Major events
 26 August – 6 September 1969: 7th National Sports Week
 16 June 1983: Post-season tour match of Arsenal, when they were beaten 2–0 by local club NIAC Mitra.
 11 July 1992: Sepultura's Arise World Tour
 28 June – 6 July 2012: 4th ASEAN School Games

References

Persebaya Surabaya
Football venues in Surabaya
Multi-purpose stadiums in Surabaya